The 2022 Wagner Seahawks football team represented Wagner College as a member of the Northeast Conference (NEC) during the 2022 NCAA Division I FCS football season. The Seahawks, led by third-year head coach Tom Masella, played their home games at Wagner College Stadium.

On October 21, Wagner defeated LIU 37-26, ending a 26-game losing streak that dated back to the 2019 season, the longest losing streak in Division I football at the time. Ironically, their last win before the losing streak was also against LIU.

Previous season

The Seahawks finished the 2021 season with a record of 0–11, 0–7 NEC play to finish in last place.

Schedule

Game Summaries

Fordham

at Rutgers

Saint Francis (PA)

at Syracuse

at Columbia

at Merrimack

LIU

at Central Connecticut

at Stonehill

Sacred Heart

at Duquesne

References

Wagner
Wagner Seahawks football seasons
Wagner Seahawks football